Golf competitions at the 2022 South American Games in Asuncion, Paraguay were held 5–8 October 2022 at the Asunción Golf Club

Schedule
The competition schedule is as follows:

Medal summary

Medal table

Medalists

Participation
Eleven nations participated in golf events of the 2022 South American Games.

References

Golf
South American Games
2022